Jordensia is a genus of mites in the family Laelapidae.

Species
 Jordensia cossi (Dugès, 1834)

References

Laelapidae